Ida Lewis Lighthouse, which was formerly the Lime Rock Lighthouse, is in the Newport harbor in Rhode Island. It is named after Ida Lewis, who lived and worked at the lighthouse from 1857 and was the official lighthouse keeper from 1879 until her death in 1911. She was celebrated for many acts of bravery in saving lives.

History 
In 1853, Congress authorized the construction of a lighthouse on Lime Rock in Newport harbor. The original lighthouse was a short stone tower with a 6th order Fresnel lens and an oil-burning lantern. The light was commissioned in 1854. In the beginning, the lighthouse keeper rowed from the shore daily to tend the light. In case of foul weather, the lighthouse keeper could stay in a small wooden shanty.

The first lighthouse keeper was James Stockbridge Lewis, who had assisted in its construction. After six months, Hosea Lewis, who was the father of James Lewis and a retired pilot, was appointed keeper. In 1857, a two-story house was built for the lighthouse keeper. Lewis and his family moved to the small island in 1857.

A few months after he moved to the island, he suffered a stroke. His wife, Ida Zordia Lewis and her children tended the light. Their eldest daughter, who was also named Ida Lewis, did much of the work. After her mother died, she was officially appointed lighthouse keeper from 1879 to 1911. The island and the lighthouse were named for Ida Lewis in 1924.

The last lighthouse keeper was Evard Jansen. He remained until the light was automated in 1927.
The original light was replaced with an automated, acetylene light on a skeleton tower. It was deactivated in 1963.

The original Fresnel lens is on display at the Museum of Newport History. The lighthouse is maintained as the clubhouse of the Ida Lewis Yacht Club. They have a light as a private aid during part of the year.

The Ida Lewis Lighthouse is on the National Register of Historic Places, No. 87001700.

See also 

National Register of Historic Places listings in Newport County, Rhode Island
Lime Rock Lighthouse Plans 1853 and 1856

References 

Buildings and structures in Newport, Rhode Island
Narragansett Bay
Lighthouses completed in 1854
Houses completed in 1857
Lighthouses on the National Register of Historic Places in Rhode Island
National Register of Historic Places in Newport, Rhode Island
1854 establishments in Rhode Island